"I Feel Alive" is a song performed by Israeli singer Imri Ziv. The song represented Israel in the Eurovision Song Contest 2017. It was written by Dolev Ram and Penn Hazut. The song was released as a digital download on 10 March 2017 by Unicell.

Eurovision Song Contest

Israel began their national final for the Eurovision Song Contest 2017, HaKokhav HaBa L'Eurovizion 2017, on 2 January 2017. The show lasted several weeks, and ended on 13 February 2017, with Ziv receiving the highest scores from the public and being declared the winner. As the winner, he won the right to represent Israel in the Eurovision Song Contest 2017, and began working on producing his Eurovision entry. On 26 February, it was revealed that his song would be called "I Feel Alive". The song was released on 9 March. Israel competed in the second half of the second semi-final at the Eurovision Song Contest.

The music video makes reference to Eurovision Song Contest 2015, when Ziv was a backup singer for Nadav Guedj in 2015 Eurovision Song Contest and to Hovi Star in the following 2016 Eurovision Song Contest.

Track listing

Charts

Release history

References

External links 
 I Feel Alive video clip on YouTube

Eurovision songs of Israel
Eurovision songs of 2017
2017 songs
2017 debut singles
English-language Israeli songs